John B. Floyd (November 13, 1854 – April 15, 1935) was a West Virginia politician, lawyer, and businessman.

Born in Logan County, West Virginia, his father was George Rogers Clark Floyd, who served as Secretary of Wisconsin Territory and then in the West Virginia Legislature. Floyd went to Rock Hill College and then to the University of Virginia. He worked on the family farm and then in the lumber business. Floyd then studied law and was admitted to the West Virginia bar and practiced law. He served in the West Virginia House of Delegates in 1881–1882, and again in 1893–1894. Floyd also served in the West Virginia Senate in 1883–1885. From 1900 to 1901, Floyd served as mayor of Charleston, West Virginia. He died at his daughter's home in Charleston, West Virginia.

See also
 List of mayors of Charleston, West Virginia

Notes

Sources
Information about John B. Floyd

1854 births
1935 deaths
People from Logan County, West Virginia
University of Virginia alumni
Businesspeople from West Virginia
West Virginia lawyers
West Virginia state senators
Members of the West Virginia House of Delegates
Mayors of Charleston, West Virginia
Lawyers from Charleston, West Virginia
19th-century American politicians
20th-century American politicians
19th-century American lawyers